Erik Andersson (born April 15, 1982) is a Swedish former professional ice hockey defenceman who last played for Malmö Redhawks of the SHL. In October 2018 Andersson officially ended his career.

References

External links

1982 births
IF Björklöven players
Linköping HC players
Living people
Malmö Redhawks players
Skellefteå AIK players
Swedish ice hockey defencemen
Sportspeople from Umeå